Presidential elections were held in Cape Verde on 11 February 2001, with a second round on 25 February after no candidate achieved outright victory in the first round. The result was a victory for Pedro Pires of the African Party for the Independence of Cape Verde, who defeated Carlos Veiga of the Movement for Democracy by just twelve votes. Pires, a former Prime Minister, took office on 22 March 2001, replacing António Mascarenhas Monteiro, who stood down after completing two terms in office.

Results

References

Cape Verde
Presidential elections in Cape Verde
Presidential
Cape Verde